List of New York Islanders broadcasters presents an excerpt as an overview of television and radio broadcasters sorted by year.

Television

The Islanders had very limited over-the-air television in the 1970s and early '80s as they shared WOR with the Rangers, Knicks and Nets. In their first two seasons, home games were televised by Teleprompter Cable. Cable coverage returned on HBO for the 1975 playoffs and 1975-76 season. Home telecasts went to LI Cable (later renamed SportsChannel) and have remained there since.

Radio

The full schedule was not carried on radio until 1978–79. WHN (1972–74) and WMCA (1974–78) carried all home games and most road games, but conflicts with Nets home games prevented some road games from being on radio.

Alternate announcers

Television

Play-by-play
George Michael: 1974–1976
Steve Albert: 1976–1980
Stan Fischler: 1977–1978
Tim Ryan: 1978–1980
Al Albert circa 1983
Spencer Ross: 1987-1989
Barry Landers: 1989-1995
Mike Crispino: Late 1990s
Jiggs McDonald: 1981; 2006–present
Steve Mears: 2008
Kenny Albert: 2010

Radio

Play-by-play
Kenny Albert: 1989–1992
Gary Stanley: circa 1994
Jim Cerny: 1997–2001
Chris King: 2008

New York Islanders
SportsChannel
Fox Sports Networks
 
broadcasters
Madison Square Garden Sports